South Springfield is a rural locality in the local government area of Dorset in the North-east region of Tasmania. The 2016 census determined a population of 25 for the state suburb of South Springfield.

History
South Springfield is a confirmed suburb/locality.

Geography
The Great Forester River rises in the south-east and flows through to the north.

Road infrastructure
The C407 route (Ten Mile Track) follows the northern boundary for a short distance. Route C406 (South Springfield Road) starts at an intersection with C407 and runs south and east to the centre of the locality, where it ends.

References

Localities of Dorset Council (Australia)
Towns in Tasmania